Jeremy Reingold is a South African swimmer and rugby player. In 1980 he set the world record in the 200 meter individual medley.

Biography
Reingold is from Cape Town, South Africa. He is married to obstacle course racing champion Carina Marx.

In 1980, at 12 years of age, he set the world record in the 200 meter long course  individual medley at 2:03.01 in Cape Town. Reingold broke the prior record, which had been set by American Bill Barrett.

Later, Reingold was a member of the South Africa national under-18 rugby union team.

See also

 List of South Africa national under-18 rugby union team players

References 

Year of birth missing (living people)
Living people
Sportspeople from Cape Town
South African male swimmers
South African rugby union players
Jewish rugby union players